Bruno Binggeli (born c. 1943) is a Swiss curler.

At the national level, he is a 1983 Swiss men's and 1987 Swiss senior champion curler.

Teams

References

External links
 

Living people
Swiss male curlers
Swiss curling champions
1940s births
Place of birth missing (living people)